The Peshawar Valley Field Force was a British field force. It was the largest of three military columns created in November 1878 at the start of the Second Anglo-Afghan War (1878-1880), each of which invaded Afghanistan by a different route. The Peshawar force initially consisted of around 16,000 men, a mix of both British and Indian Army regiments, under the command of Lieutenant General Sir Samuel J. Browne.

Browne's force crossed into Afghanistan from India in November 1878 and advanced up the Khyber Pass in the direction of Ali Masjid. Here, on 21 November 1878, the force gained victory at the Battle of Ali Masjid, the first battle of the war. The Field Force then progressed further into Afghanistan towards Kabul, occupying Jalalabad on 20 December 1878. After camping here over the winter, they advanced to Gandamak, 50 miles east of Kabul, in April 1879. The advance was however slow, given the difficulty in keeping communications open and the hostile attitude of the Afghan people. The Treaty of Gandamak in May 1879 marked the end of the first phase of the Afghan War and led to the withdrawal of the Peshawar Valley Field Force to India, where it was disbanded in mid–1879.

Composition
At the start of the Second Anglo-Afghan War the Force was made up of the following:

Sir Samuel J. Browne (Overall Command of the Peshawar Valley Field Force)

 Cavalry Brigade
 Commander: Brigadier-General Sir Charles J. S. Gough
 10th Royal Hussars (2 squadrons)
 11th Prince of Wales's Own Lancers
 Guides Cavalry
 Royal Artillery
 Commander: Colonel W. J. Williams
 One Horse Battery
 One Field Battery
 Three Heavy Batteries
 Three Mountain Batteries:
 21st (Kohat) Mountain Battery (Frontier Force)
 22nd (Derajat) Mountain Battery (Frontier Force)
 24th (Hazara) Mountain Battery (Frontier Force)

 First Infantry Brigade
 Commander: Brigadier-General Herbert T. Macpherson
 4th Battalion Rifle Brigade
 20th (Punjab) Regiment, Bengal Native Infantry
 4th Gurkha Rifles
 Second Infantry Brigade
 Commander: Brigadier-General John A. Tytler
 1st Battalion Leicestershire Regiment
 Guides Infantry
 1st Sikhs
 Third Infantry Brigade
 Commander: Brigadier-General Frederick E. Appleyard
 81st Loyal Lincolnshire Volunteers
 14th Sikhs
 27th Punjabis
 Fourth Infantry Brigade
 Commander: Brigadier-General W. Browne
 51st King's Own Yorkshire Light Infantry
 6th Bengal Native (Light) Infantry
 45th Sikhs
 Bengal Sappers and Miners

References

Ad hoc units and formations of the British Army
Peshawar
British Army deployments
Second Anglo-Afghan War